Mourera alcicornis is a species of flowering plant belong to the family Podostemaceae. It is found in South America.

References 

Podostemaceae
Plants described in 1953
Flora of South America